Lamas may refer to:

 the plural form of Lama, a title for a teacher of the Dharma in Tibetan Buddhism.

Places
Lamas Province, Peru
Lamas District
Lamas, Peru, the capital of Lamas Province and seat of Lamas District
Lamas (Braga), a parish in Braga District, Portugal
Lamas (Cadaval), a parish in Cadaval Municipality, Lisbon District, Portugal 
Lamas (Miranda do Corvo), a parish in Miranda do Corvo Municipality, Coimbra District, Portugal
Lamas (Macedo de Cavaleiros), a parish in Macedo de Cavaleiros Municipality, Bragança District, Portugal
Santa Maria de Lamas, a parish in Aveiro District, Portugal
Lamas, Norfolk, a village in England

Other uses
Lamas (surname)
Lamas Quechua, a variety of Quechuan language
London and Middlesex Archaeological Society (LAMAS)

See also
Lama (disambiguation)
Lammas
Llama (disambiguation)